This is a list of the paintings and works of calligraphy exhibited at the National Treasure Gallery in the Tokyo National Museum.

The National Treasure Gallery is located in Room 2 of the Honkan (Japanese Gallery), and like the name indicates it is dedicated to the display of items designated as National Treasures of Japan.

At least one National Treasure is on exhibit at any given moment, changing approximately every month.

Works exhibited

2020

2019

2018

2017

References

External links
Website of the  Honkan (Tokyo National Museum)

National Treasure Gallery